La Reina del Sur is a Spanish-language telenovela based on a novel of the same name by Spanish author Arturo Pérez-Reverte. The first season is produced by the American television network Telemundo in conjunction with the Antena 3 network and RTI Producciones, while season 2 is co-produced by Telemundo Global Studios and Netflix. It premiered on 28 February 2011. The series depicts the rise of Teresa Mendoza (Kate del Castillo), a young woman from Mexico who becomes the most powerful drug trafficker in southern Spain.

With a $10 million budget it is the second most expensive telenovela ever produced by Telemundo, the first being El Señor de los Cielos. An English language remake, Queen of the South, premiered in June 2016 on USA Network, starring Alice Braga.

The series has been renewed for a second season that premiered on 22 April 2019. On 16 July 2020, Telemundo announced that the series was renewed for a third season. The third season premiered on 18 October 2022.

Synopsis

Season 1 (2011) 
The series is the television adaptation of the literary work of the same name of Spanish author Arturo Pérez-Reverte. It is the chronicle of the rise to power of a Mexican woman within the world of international drug trafficking. Teresa Mendoza begins her adventure as a humble young woman in love with a pilot employed by the Mexican cartels. When they execute her boyfriend, Teresa flees, desperate to avoid the same fate. Her escape takes her to the south of Spain where she tries to start a new life. However, she is once again immersed in the world of narcotics trafficking, and for a second time, she suffers the death of a beloved man. After several blows, Teresa decides to take the reins of her destiny and becomes the head of her own organization. This is done with the help of a woman she meets in prison, who decides to share her fortune with Teresa. Through strategic alliances and a strong sense for business, Teresa "La Mexicana" begins to control an intercontinental drug distribution business. However, her great success is accompanied by a high personal price, and Teresa's happiness and heart are tested.

Season 2 (2019) 

The second season of La Reina del Sur follows the life of Teresa Mendoza eight years after the events of the first-season finale. Isolating herself from the rest of the world, Teresa now lives an idyllic life in Italian Tuscany, but the kidnapping of her daughter forces her to go back to the underworld and reintroduces herself into drug trafficking. To save her daughter, Teresa needs to confront her old enemies once more and face her past that she tried to leave behind.

Episodes

Cast

Main

Introduced in season 1 
 Kate del Castillo as Teresa Mendoza (seasons 1–3)
 Humberto Zurita as Epifanio Vargas (seasons 1–3)
 Rafael Amaya as Raimundo Dávila Parra "El Güero"
 Iván Sánchez as Santiago López Fisterra "El Gallego"
 Cristina Urgel as Patricia O'Farrell
 Alberto Jiménez as Oleg Yasikov 
 Miguel de Miguel as Teo Aljarafe
 Gabriel Porras as Roberto Gato Márquez "El Gato Fierros"
 Salvador Zerboni as Ramiro Vargas "El Ratas"
 Nacho Fresneda as Dris Larbi 
 Mónica Estarreado as Fátima Mansur 
 Alejandro Calva as César Güemes "Batman" (seasons 1–3)
 Cuca Escribano as Sheila (seasons 1–3)
 Dagoberto Gama as Potequim Gálvez "El Pote"
 Christian Tappan as Willy Rangel (seasons 1–2)
 Eduardo Velasco as Coronel Abdelkader Chaib (seasons 1–2)
 Alfonso Vallejo as Manolo Céspedes 
 Pablo Castañón as Lalo Veiga
 Miguel Ángel Blanco as Siso Pernas (seasons 1–2)
 Lorena Santos as Soraya
 Sara Maldonado as Verónica Cortés / Guadalupe Romero 
 Carmen Navarro as Marcela "La Conejo" (seasons 1–2)
 Santiago Meléndez as Saturnino "Nino" Juárez
 Juan José Arjona as Pablo Flores (seasons 1–2)

Introduced in season 2 
 Raoul Bova as Francesco Belmondo 
 Paola Núñez as Manuela
 Mark Tacher as Alejandro Alcalá 
 Flavio Medina as Zurdo Villa 
 Luisa Gavasa as Cayetana Segovia 
 Antonio Gil as Oleg Yosikov (seasons 2–3)
 Kika Edgar as Genoveva Alcalá (seasons 2–3)
 Lincoln Palomeque as Faustino Sánchez Godoy (seasons 2–3; guest season 1)
 Patricia Reyes Spíndola as Carmen Martínez 
 Carmen Flores as Charo 
 Karine Amaya as Marixa
 Emmanuel Orenday as Danilo Márquez (seasons 2–3)
 Horacio Colomé as Fermín
 Alejandro Speitzer as Ray Dávila
 Tiago Correa as Jonathan Peres (season 2; recurring season 3)
 Ilja Rosendahl as Alexej 
 Sara Vidorreta as Rocío Aljarafe (season 2; recurring season 3)
 Agata Herranz as Paloma Aljarafe 
 Abdelali El Aziz as Ahmed (season 2; guest season 1)
 Isabella Sierra as Sofía Dantes (seasons 2–3)

Introduced in season 3 
 Pêpê Rapazote as Pablo Landero
 Ed Trucco as Ernie Palmero
 Horacio Garcia Rojas as Charlie Velazquez
 Beth Chamberlin as Jane Kosar
 Sofia Lama as Susana Guzmán

Recurring and guest 
 Karim El-Kerem as Mohamed Mansur (season 1)
 Klaus as Eddie Álvarez (season 1)
 Nerea Garmendia as Eugenia Montijo (season 1)
 Juan Pablo Raba as Jaime Gutiérrez Solana (season 1)
 Ezequiel Montalt as Jaime "Jimmy" Arenas (season 1)
 Rodolfo Valdés as El Chino Parra (season 1)
 Jesús Castro as Jesús (season 2)
 Pol Monen as Juan (season 2)
 Eduardo Yáñez as Antonio Alcalá (seasons 2–3)
 Aitor Luna as Pedro (season 2)
 Eduardo Santamarina as Mariano Bravo (season 2)
 Eric Roberts as Erick Sheldon (season 2)
 María Camila Giraldo as Jimena Montes (season 2)
 Vera Mercado as Virginia Vargas (season 2)
 Norma Angélica as Morgana (season 2)
 Eduardo Pérez as Sergio (season 2)
 Dimitry Anisimov as Anton (season 2)
 Aroha Hafez as Triana (season 2)
 Anna Ciocchetti as Marietta Lancaster (season 2)
 Roberto Abraham Wohlmuth as Lencho (season 2)
 Daniel Martínez as Senator (season 3)
 Carlos Valencia as Montaño (season 3)
 Arturo Ríos as Delio Jurado (season 3)
 Dmitry Anisimov as Anton Potapushin (season 3)
 Denia Agalianou as Vanessa (season 3)
 Anderley Palomino as Mateo Mena (season 3)
 Noé Hernández as General Carlos Garrido (season 3)

Remake

An English language remake, titled Queen of the South, premiered in June 2016 on USA Network, starring Alice Braga.

Ratings 
  

| link3            = List of La Reina del Sur episodes#Season 3 (2022)
| timeslot3        = MonFri 9:00 p.m.
| episodes3        = 60
| start3           = 
| end3             = 
| startrating3     = 1.21
| endrating3       = 1.10
| viewers3         = |2}}  
}}

Awards and nominations

Source material 
Pérez-Reverte, author of the novel,  has stated that a great source of inspiration were Mexican drug ballads, country-polka songs that tell the stories about real life Mexican drug lords.

One of the real life characters that inspired the novel is Sandra Ávila Beltrán, known as the Queen of the Pacific, famous for being one of the first female drug traffickers to reach the level of "Boss" in the Mexican cartels, a place usually reserved for men.

References

External links
 

2011 telenovelas
2011 American television series debuts
2011 Spanish television series debuts
American television series based on telenovelas
Spanish-language American telenovelas
RTI Producciones telenovelas
Telemundo telenovelas
Works about Mexican drug cartels
2019 telenovelas
Spanish-language Netflix original programming
Television series based on Spanish novels
2022 telenovelas